Retivyy ("Ardent") was a Project 1135 Burevestnik-class Guard Ship (SKR) or Krivak-class frigate. With an armament based around the URPK-4 Metel anti-submarine missile system, the vessel served with the Pacific Fleet of the Soviet and Russian Navies. The ship was launched on 14 August 1976 by A.A. Zhdanov in Leningrad, the second of the class built by the shipyard. After joining the fleet, the vessel took part in the search for the crew of the crashed Lockheed P-3 Orion AF 586. In 1981, the vessel sailed as part of a task force along the west coast of the United States to test and measure American defences. Decommissioned on 4 August 1995, the vessel was subsequently sold to a South Korean company to be broken up.

Design
Designed by N.P. Sobolov, Retivyy was the twelfth Project 1135 Guard Ship (SKR) to be launched, and the second from the shipyard of A.A. Zhdanov in Leningrad. The vessel is named for a Russian word which can be translated as "ardent".  Retivyy served with the Soviet Navy, and the Russian Navy after the dissolution of the Soviet Union, as an anti-submarine frigate. The ship was designed to create safe areas for friendly ballistic missile submarines close to the coast.

The ship had a complement of 192, including 23 officers.

The ship was designed for anti-submarine warfare around four URPK-4 Metel missiles (NATO reporting name SS-N-14 'Silex') mounted on the foredeck. The missiles were backed up by a pair of quadruple  torpedo tubes and a pair of RBU-6000  Smerch-2 anti-submarine rocket launchers mounted forward of the bridge. Defence against aircraft was provided by forty 4K33 OSA-MA (SA-N-4 'Gecko') surface to air missiles which were launched from two twin ZIF-122 launchers, one mounted forward and the other aft. Two twin  AK-726 guns were mounted aft, along with two single  21 km guns on the superstructure. Mines were also carried, either eighteen IGDM-500 KSM, fourteen KAM, fourteen KB Krab, ten Serpey, four PMR-1, seven PMR-2, seven MTPK-1, fourteen RM-1 or twelve UDM-2.

The ship had a well-equipped sensor suite, including a single MR-310A Angara-A air/surface search radar, Volga navigation radar, Don navigation radar, MP-401S Start-S ESM radar system, Nickel-KM and Kremniyy IFF and ARP-50R radio direction finder. An extensive sonar complement was fitted, including MG-332 Titan-2, MG-325 Vega and MGS-400K, along with two MG-7 Braslet anti-saboteur sonars and the MG-26 Hosta underwater communication system. The ship was also fitted with the PK-16 ship-borne decoy dispenser system.

Service
Retivyy was laid down by A.A. Zhdanov in Leningrad on 12 June 1974, the second of the class to be ordered from the shipbuilder, and was given the yard number 712. Launched on 14 August 1976 and commissioned later that year on 28 December, the ship was accepted into the Pacific Fleet on 5 February 1977 as part of the 173th Brigade and operated in the Atlantic, Indian and Pacific Oceans. On 30 October 1978, the ship participated in the search for the crew of the Lockheed P-3 Orion AF 586 from VP-9 that had crashed off the coast of the Kamchatka Peninsula.

The search took place between 22 and 34 March. The following year, between 25 August and 22 September, the vessel sailed with Rezkiy again, but this time as part of a task force led by the Project 1134B Berkut B vessel , from the Aleutian Islands south along the west coast of the United States. The purpose of the voyage was to test and measure the US response. Later, Retivyy underwent anti-submarine training with Razumnyy in 1988. With the dissolution of the Soviet Union on 26 December 1991, the ship was transferred to the Russian Navy. Soon after, the ship was retired. Decommissioned on 4 August 1995, Retivyy was stricken on 3 September and sold to a South Korean company to be broken up.

Pennant numbers

References

Citations

Bibliography
 
 
 
 
 

Ships built at Severnaya Verf
1976 ships
Krivak-class frigates of the Russian Navy
Cold War frigates of the Soviet Union